Jo Cribb is a New Zealand civil servant who headed the Ministry for Women. She has given a talk at TEDxWellington and published work on volunteerism.

Education 
Cribb is a graduate of Cambridge University and has a PhD from Victoria University of Wellington in Public Policy that investigated the contracting relationship between governments and NGOs which completed in part as a New Zealand Federation of Graduate Women Fellow.

Career 
Between 2012 and 2017, Cribb held the appointment as chief executive for the Ministry for Women Affairs. Prior to this, she led policy and research functions at other New Zealand government agencies, such as the Ministry of Social Development, the Families Commission, the Department of Internal Affairs, and the State Services Commission.

Cribb also held appointment as the Deputy Children's Commissioner and led the Children's Commissioner's Expert Advisory Group on Solutions to Child Poverty. 

Cribb's book, Being Accountable: Voluntary Organisations, Government Agencies and Contracted Social Services in New Zealand (2007) analyzes the way that people in the voluntary sector view accountability to the government and nonprofit service providers.

Honours 
 Westpac Leadership Fellowship 2014
 Finalist, New Zealand Woman of Influence Awards 2015
 Finalist, New Zealand Woman of Influence Awards 2016
Winner, Not-for-Profit Governance Leader, Women in Governance Awards 2021

Publications 

 Cribb, Jo, and Rachel Petero. 2020. Take Your Space : Successful Women Share Their Secrets. Auckland: Onetree House Ltd.
 Cribb, Jo, and David Glover. 2018. Don’t Worry about the Robots : How to Survive and Thrive in the New World of Work. Auckland, New Zealand: Allen & Unwin.
 ‌Cribb, Jo, and Victoria University. 2006. Being Accountable : Voluntary Organisations, Government Agencies and Contracted Social Services in New Zealand. Wellington N.Z.: Institute Of Policy Studies.

References

External sources 

 Profile on the Institute of Directors website

Victoria University of Wellington alumni
Alumni of the University of Cambridge
People from Wellington City
New Zealand public servants
Living people
Year of birth missing (living people)